Armenia sent a delegation to compete at the 2008 Summer Paralympics in Beijing, People's Republic of China.

Sports

Powerlifting

See also
Armenia at the Paralympics
Armenia at the 2008 Summer Olympics

External links
International Paralympic Committee

Nations at the 2008 Summer Paralympics
2008
Summer Paralympics